Spierdijk is a village in the Dutch province of North Holland.

The village was first mentioned in 1365 as Spierdijck, and is a combination a long reed stick and dike. Spierdijk developed on the edge of the Wogmeer as a peat excavation village.

The Catholic St Georgius Church is a three aisled cruciform church with needle spire which was built between 1849 and 1850.

Gallery

References

Populated places in North Holland
Koggenland